Gour Express is an express train of the Indian Railways connecting Kolkata with the district of Malda. The train covers a distance of  up to Malda with the numbers 13153/54.

Timeline
The Gour Express commenced operations as a triweekly express service between Sealdah and Malda from 20 April 1980. The train proved successful and the then railway minister A. B. A. Ghani Khan Choudhury played a key role in increasing the frequency of the service. On 2 October 1982, he flagged off the first run of the train as a daily service.

Through coaches to Balurghat were added to the train after the completion of the broad-gauge rail link to Balurghat in 2004. Now electrification work is under construction to pull the whole train to balurghat with electric loco..

Important stoppages
 
 
 
 
 
 
 
 
 
 
 
  (only for 13154 service)

Gour Link Express stoppage

Timings
 13153 leaves Sealdah around 22:15 everyday and reaches Malda Town at 5:55 next day.
 13154 departs Malda Town around 21:35 everyday and reaches Sealdah at 5:00 next day.

Coach composition
The train consists of 22 passenger coaches. The train runs with the following coach composition -

 1 Composite 1st A/C – A/C 2 tier coach
 3 A/C 2-tier coaches
 2 A/C 3-tier coaches
 12 Non-A/C sleeper coaches
 2 Unreserved sleeper coaches (UR)
 2 Luggage-cum-Guard coaches with unreserved seating (SLR)

Of these, one Luggage-cum-Guard, one unreserved sleeper, three reserved non-A/C sleeper, one A/C 3-tier and one A/C 2-tier coach were used for the through service between Sealdah and Balurghat (now closed).

Traction
As the route from Sealdah to Malda is fully electrified, it is hauled by a Howrah/Sealdah-based WAP-4/WAP-7 throughout its entire journey.

See also 
Old Malda Junction
 Sealdah railway station
 Malda Town railway station
 Gangarampur railway station
 Balurghat railway station

References

Transport in Kolkata
Transport in Maldah
Named passenger trains of India
Rail transport in West Bengal
Express trains in India